Busanda (1947–1968) was an American Thoroughbred racehorse best remembered as the dam of U.S. Racing Hall of Fame inductee Buckpasser.

Background 
Busanda was sired by 1937 U.S. Triple Crown champion War Admiral, a son of Man o' War, who was ranked first in the Blood-Horse magazine list of the top 100 U.S. Thoroughbred champions of the 20th Century. Busanda's dam, Businesslike, was sired by U.S. Racing Hall of Fame inductee Blue Larkspur and out of the extremely important broodmare La Troienne.

Businesslike was owned by Colonel E. R. Bradley at the time of Busanda's conception. When Bradley died in August 1946, Businesslike was sold to Ogden Phipps, who became Busanda's breeder of record.

Busanda's name is an acronym for the Bureau of Supplies and Accounts, which was a Navy bureau that Phipps had served in during World War II.

Busanda was conditioned by Hall of Fame trainer "Sunny Jim" Fitzsimmons, who handled a large string of horse for the Phipps family. In some of her races, though, Fitzsimmons' assistant Bartholomew Sweeney is recorded as the trainer.

Racing career 
In an era when most Thoroughbreds were raced frequently and for two to three years, Busanda made sixty-five starts during four seasons of competition. At age two, her best showing was a third-place finish to winner Bed o'Roses in the Selima Stakes at Laurel Park Racecourse. Although as a three-year-old in 1950 she won the important Alabama Stakes, it was at age four in 1951 when she had her best campaign. That year, her performances included wins against male horses when she captured the New Castle and Suburban handicaps as well as the Saratoga Cup. In 1952, in addition to her second straight Saratoga Cup, she won the Diana Handicap before being retired to broodmare duty.

Retirement 
Bred to U.S. Racing Hall of Fame inductee Tom Fool, in 1963 Busanda produced the colt Buckpasser, who was the 1966 American Horse of the Year and a 1970 U.S. Racing Hall of Fame inductee.

Pedigree

References
 Busanda 's pedigree and partial racing stats

Specific

1947 racehorse births
Racehorses bred in Kentucky
Racehorses trained in the United States
Thoroughbred family 1-x
Godolphin Arabian sire line